Nora (born November 6, 2015) is a polar bear at the Oregon Zoo. She was born at the Columbus Zoo and Aquarium in Ohio and later lived at the Hogle Zoo in Utah.

See also
 List of individual bears

References

2015 animal births
Individual polar bears
Oregon Zoo